The 2007 FORU Oceania Cup was a rugby union competition for countries and territories in Oceania with national teams in the developmental band.

The tournament was won by Papua New Guinea.


First round

Western Zone 

Ranking:
 1.   qualified for final 
 2. 
 3.

Eastern Zone 

Ranking:
 1.   qualified for final 
 2.

Final

See also
 FORU Oceania Cup

2007–08
2007 rugby union tournaments for national teams
2008 rugby union tournaments for national teams
2007 in Oceanian rugby union
2008 in Oceanian rugby union